Epukiro Constituency is an electoral constituency in the Omaheke Region of Namibia. It had 6,101 inhabitants in 2004 and 4,646 registered voters . Its district capital is the settlement of Epukiro, it further contains the settlements of Otjinoko, Otjijarua, Omauezonjanda, and Otjimanangombe. The royal homestead of the Ovambanderu people is situated in this constituency in the settlement of Ezorongondo.

Politics
The 2015 regional election was won by Cornelius Kanguatjivi of the SWAPO Party with 1,038 votes, followed by Juda Hanyero of the National Unity Democratic Organisation (NUDO) with 882 votes and Nokokurekungudje Nguvauva of the South West Africa National Union (SWANU) with 181 votes. The SWAPO candidate also won the 2020 regional election. Piniel Pakarae obtained 1,445 votes, followed by Sandie Tjaronda, an independent candidate, with 760 votes and Alex Kandetu (NUDO) with 231 votes.

See also
 Administrative divisions of Namibia

References 

Constituencies of Omaheke Region
States and territories established in 1992
1992 establishments in Namibia